Lili Ilse Elvenes (28 December 1882 – 13 September 1931), better known as Lili Elbe, was a Danish painter, trans woman and among the early recipients of gender-affirming surgery (sex reassignment surgery).

She was a painter under her birth name Einar Wegener. After transitioning in 1930, she changed her legal name to Lili Ilse Elvenes and stopped painting; she later adopted the surname Elbe. She was the first known recipient of a uterus transplant in attempt to achieve pregnancy, but died due to the subsequent complications.

The UK and US versions of her semi-autobiographical narrative were published posthumously in 1933 under the title Man into Woman: An Authentic Record of a Change of Sex. A film inspired by her life, The Danish Girl, was released in 2015.

Early life 
It is generally believed that Elbe was born in 1882, in Vejle, Denmark, the child of Ane Marie Thomsen and spice merchant Mogens Wilhelm Wegener according to the registry at St. Nicolai Church (Vejle). Her year of birth is sometimes stated as 1886, which appears to be from a book about her which has some facts changed to protect the identities of the persons involved. Facts about the life of her wife Gerda Gottlieb suggest that the 1882 date is correct because they married while at college in 1904, when Elbe would have been just eighteen if the 1886 date were correct.

It is speculated that Elbe was intersex, although that has been disputed. Some reports indicate that she already had rudimentary ovaries in her abdomen and may have had Klinefelter syndrome.

Marriage and modelling 

Elbe met Gerda Gottlieb while they were students at the Royal Danish Academy of Fine Arts in Copenhagen, and they married in 1904 when Gottlieb was 19 and Elbe was 22. Gerda came from a conservative family as her father was a vicar in the Lutheran church.

They worked as illustrators, with Elbe specialising in landscape paintings while Gottlieb illustrated books and fashion magazines.

They travelled through Italy and France before settling in 1912 in Paris, where Elbe could live more openly as a woman by posing as Gottlieb's sister-in-law.

Elbe started dressing in women's clothes after she found she enjoyed the stockings and heels she wore to fill in for Gottlieb's model, actress , who on one occasion was late for a sitting. Larssen suggested the name Lili, and by the 1920s, Elbe regularly presented with that name as a woman, attending various festivities and entertaining guests in her house. Gottlieb became famous for her paintings of beautiful women with haunting, almond-shaped eyes, dressed in chic apparel. The model for these depictions of petites femmes fatales was Elbe. Elbe stopped painting after her transition.

Surgeries and dissolution of marriage 

In 1930, Elbe went to Germany for sex reassignment surgery, which was highly experimental at the time. A series of four operations were carried out over a period of two years. The first surgery, removal of the testicles, was performed by Erwin Gohrbandt, under the supervision of sexologist Magnus Hirschfeld in Berlin. The rest of her surgeries were carried out by Kurt Warnekros, a doctor at the Dresden Municipal Women's Clinic. (The clinic and its records were later destroyed in Allied bombing raids.) The second operation was to implant an ovary onto her abdominal musculature, the third to remove the penis and the scrotum.
By this time, her case was a sensation in Danish and German newspapers. A Danish court annulled the couple's marriage in October 1930, and Elbe was able to have her sex and name legally changed, including receiving a passport as Lili Ilse Elvenes. The pseudonym "Lili Elbe" was first used in a Danish newspaper article written by Copenhagen journalist Louise "Loulou" Lassen for Politiken in February 1931. Elbe returned to Dresden and began a relationship with French art dealer Claude Lejeune, whom she wanted to marry and with whom she wished to have children.

In 1931, she had her fourth surgery, to transplant a uterus and construct a vaginal canal. This made her one of the earliest transgender women to undergo a vaginoplasty surgery, a few weeks after Erwin Gohrbandt performed the experimental procedure on Dora Richter.

Death 
Elbe's immune system rejected the transplanted uterus, and the operation and a subsequent surgical revision caused infection, which led to her death from cardiac arrest on 13 September 1931, three months after the surgery.

The grave was levelled in the 1960s. In April 2016, a new tombstone was inaugurated, financed by Focus Features, the production company of The Danish Girl. The tombstone does not record the date of Elbe's birth, just her name and places of birth and death.

Gallery of work

In popular culture 
The LGBT film festival MIX Copenhagen gives four "Lili" awards named after Elbe.

In 2000, David Ebershoff wrote The Danish Girl, a fictionalised account of Elbe's life. It was an international bestseller and translated into many languages. In 2015, it was made into a film, also called The Danish Girl, produced by Gail Mutrux and Neil LaBute and starring Eddie Redmayne as Elbe. The film was well received at the Venice Film Festival in September 2015, though it has been criticised for casting a cisgender man to play a trans woman. Both the novel and film omitted topics, including Gottlieb's sexuality, which is evidenced by the subjects in her erotic drawings, and the disintegration of Gottlieb and Elbe's relationship after their annulment.

On 28 December 2022, Google Doodle celebrated Lili Elbe’s 140th birthday.

Tobias Picker's opera based-on Elbe's life, featuring Lucia Lucas, will be premiered in 2023 at Theater St. Gallen.

References

Bibliography

Further reading 
 Man into woman: an authentic record of a change of sex / Lili Elbe; edited by Niels Hoyer [i.e. E. Harthern]; translated from the German by H.J. Stenning; introd. by Norman Haire. London: Jarrold Publishers, 1933 (Original Danish ed. published in 1931 under title: Fra mand til kvinde. Later edition: Man into woman: the first sex change, a portrait of Lili Elbe – the true and remarkable transformation of the painter Einar Wegener. London: Blue Boat Books, 2004.
 Schnittmuster des Geschlechts. Transvestitismus und Transsexualität in der frühen Sexualwissenschaft by Dr. Rainer Herrn (2005), pp. 204–211. . German study containing a detailed account of the operations of Lili Elbe, their preparations and the role of Magnus Hirschfeld.
 "When a woman paints women" / Andrea Rygg Karberg and "The transwoman as model and co-creator: resistance and becoming in the back-turning Lili Elbe" / Tobias Raun in Gerda Wegener / edited by Andrea Rygg Karberg ... [et al.]. – Denmark, Arken Museum of Modern Art, 2015.

External links 

 Lili Elbe on Biography.com
 Lili Elbe on LGBT History Month
 Lili Elbe Digital Archive
 From the doll's pram into normative femininity. Lili Elbe and the journalistic staging of transsexuality in Denmark German journal article. NORDEUROPAforum 20 (2010:1–2), 33–61
 Represented in ARKEN Museum of Modern Art's Gerda Wegener exhibition November 2015 – January 2017

1882 births
1931 deaths
20th-century Danish painters
Danish erotic artists
Danish landscape painters
Intersex women
Danish LGBT artists
Transgender memoirists
Danish transgender people
People from Vejle Municipality
Royal Danish Academy of Fine Arts alumni
Transgender painters
Transgender women
Uterus transplant recipients